Berberis jujuyensis is a shrub in the Berberidaceae described as a species in 1953. It is native to Jujuy Province in northwestern Argentina and to nearby Tarija region of Bolivia.

References

Flora of South America
jujuyensis
Plants described in 1953